Park Towne Place is a historic apartment complex located in the Logan Square neighborhood of Philadelphia. The complex consists of four eighteen-story buildings (with floors numbered one through nineteen with no thirteen), a one-story office area, an underground parking garage, and a pool and spa complex.  It was designed by Milton Schwartz in the International style, using reinforced concrete with limestone-tan brick, white marble, and bright aluminum trim and glass. it was constructed between 1957 and 1959. The apartment buildings are in the shape of rectangular cuboids.

Park Towne Place is owned by Aimco, a publicly traded real estate investment trust. In 2014, Aimco selected Tryba Architects of Denver to renovate the complex. 

Park Towne Place was added to the National Register of Historic Places in 2011, and receives a significant tax abatement as a consequence.

In September 2021, all four towers were evacuated following flooding caused by Tropical Storm Ida.

References

Residential buildings on the National Register of Historic Places in Philadelphia

Residential buildings completed in 1959